Ciaccia is an Italian surname.

List of people with the surname 
 Frank Ciaccia (born 1959), Canadian former soccer player
 John Ciaccia (1933–2018), Italian-born Canadian politician

See also 
 Cianciana

Italian-language surnames
Surnames of Italian origin